Queen Margaret may refer to:

Queens regnant
 Margaret of Scotland (Maid of Norway) (1286–1290), heiress of Scotland and disputed Queen of Scots 
 Margaret I of Denmark (1353–1412), de facto Queen Regnant of Denmark, Norway and Sweden in the early 15th century
 Margrethe II of Denmark (born 1940), Queen Regnant of Denmark since 1972
 Tui Manu'a Matelita (1872–1895), born Margaret Young, Queen of Manu'a in the late 19th century

Empress consort
 see below: Margaret of Hungary

Queens consort
 Saint Margaret of Scotland (c. 1045–1093), Queen Consort of Malcolm III
 Margareta Hasbjörnsdatter, Queen Consort of Harald III of Denmark
 Margaret Fredkulla (1080s–1130), Queen Consort of Magnus III of Norway and King Niels of Denmark
 Margaret of Navarre (1135–1183), Queen Consort of William I of Sicily
 Margaret of Sweden (c. 1155–1209), Queen Consort of King Sverre of Norway
 Margaret of France (1157–1197), junior Queen Consort of Henry the Young King of England and Queen Consort of Béla III of Hungary
 Margaret of Hungary (born 1175, living 1223), Byzantine Empress by marriage, in second marriage Queen consort of Thessalonica
 Margaret of Bohemia (also known as Dagmar of Bohemia; c. 1186–1212/13), Queen Consort of Valdemar II of Denmark
 Margaret of Austria (c. 1204–1266), Queen Consort of Henry VII of Germany and Ottokar II of Bohemia
 Margaret Skulesdatter (1208–1270), Queen Consort of Haakon IV of Norway
 Margaret of Bourbon (1211–1256), Queen Consort of Theobald I of Navarre
 Margaret of Provence (1221–1295), Queen Consort of Louis IX of France
 Margaret Sambiria (1230?–1282), Queen Consort of Christopher I of Denmark
 Margaret of England (1240–1275), Queen Consort of Alexander III of Scotland
 Margaret of Burgundy (1250–1308), Queen Consort of Charles I of Sicily
 Margaret of Brandenburg (1270–1315), Queen Consort of Przemysł II of Poland 
 Margaret of Brabant (1276–1311), Queen Consort of Henry VII of Germany
 Margaret of Lusignan (1276–1296), Queen Consort of Thoros III of Armenia
 Margaret of Scotland (1261–1283), Queen Consort of Eric II of Norway
 Margaret of France (died 1318), Queen Consort of Edward I of England
 Margaret of Burgundy (1290–1315), Queen Consort of Louis X of France
 Margaret of Bohemia (1335–1349), Queen Consort of Louis I of Hungary
 Margaret Drummond (1340–1375), Queen Consort of David II of Scotland
 Margaret of Durazzo (1347–1412), Queen Consort of Charles III of Naples
 Margaret of Prades (1395–1422/88–1429), Queen Consort of King Martin of Aragon
 Margaret of Anjou (1430–1482), Queen Consort of Henry VI of England, appears in Shakespeare's first tetralogy of history plays
 Margaret of Denmark (1456–1486), Queen Consort of James III of Scotland
 Margaret Tudor (1489–1541), Queen Consort of James IV and elder sister of Henry VIII
 Marguerite de Navarre (1492–1549), Queen Consort of Henry II of Navarra
 Margaret Leijonhufvud (1516–1551), Queen Consort of Gustav I of Sweden
 Margaret of Valois (1553–1615), Queen Consort of Henry IV of France
 Margaret of Austria (1584–1611), Queen Consort of Philip III of Spain
 Margherita of Savoy (1851–1926), Queen Consort of Umberto I of Italy

Organisations
Queen Margaret's School, York, an independent girls' school in York, England
Queen Margaret University, in Edinburgh, Scotland
Queen Margaret Union, a student union at the University of Glasgow, Scotland